Bertha Allen ( Moses; 1934 – 7 May 2010) was a Vuntut Gwitchin women's rights and aboriginal rights advocate.

She was a recipient of the Governor General's Award in Commemoration of the Persons Case and is a Member of the Order of Canada. She was the founding president of the Native Women's Association of the Northwest Territories, as well as serving as president of the Advisory Council on the Status of Women in the Northwest Territories and president of the Native Women's Association of Canada.

A member of the Vuntut Gwitchin First Nation of Old Crow, Yukon, she married Victor Allen, an Inuvialuit man, and had six children. Allen died of cancer in 2010.

References

1934 births
2010 deaths
20th-century First Nations people
21st-century First Nations people
Canadian women's rights activists
Vuntut Gwitchin people
Governor General's Award in Commemoration of the Persons Case winners
Indspire Awards
Members of the Order of Canada
20th-century Canadian women
Indigenous Canadian feminism